Pamir may refer to:

Geographical features
 Pamir Mountains, a mountain range in Central Asia
 Pamir-Alay, a mountain system in Tajikistan, Kyrgyzstan and Uzbekistan, part of the Pamir Mountains
A pamir (valley) is a high plateau or valley surrounded by mountains
Great Pamir, a high valley in the Wakhan, on the border of Afghanistan and Tajikistan
Little Pamir, a high valley in the Wakhan, Afghanistan
 Pamir River, on the border of Tajikistan and Afghanistan

Other uses
 Pamir (ship), a German sailing ship
 Pamir Airways, based in Afghanistan
 Pamir languages
 Pamir Alevism, a sect of Batini-Ismailis in Turkestan

See also
 Pax Pamir, a board game set in 19th century Afghanistan